Hasarina is a genus of jumping spiders with a single described species, Hasarina contortospinosa. It is found in China.

References

  (2007): The world spider catalog, version 8.0. American Museum of Natural History.

Salticidae
Spiders of China
Monotypic Salticidae genera